The River Mulcair, or Mulkear, rises in the Slieve Felim Mountains and Silvermine Mountains in Ireland, and flows through the east of County Limerick before joining the River Shannon near Annacotty. It flows through Counties Limerick and Tipperary. The principal tributaries are the Dead River, the Bilboa River and the Newport River (Tipperary).

The River Mulcair is an Atlantic salmon and brown trout river with a 1 March to 30 September fishing season. The river is currently designated as catch and release for salmon.

References

External links 
 The Mulcair(Mulkear) Anglers Association

Mulcair
Rivers of County Tipperary
Tributaries of the River Shannon